The 1976–77 Idaho State Bengals men's basketball team represented Idaho State University during the  NCAA Division I men's basketball season. The Bengals were led by sixth-year head coach Jim Killingsworth and played their home games on campus at the ISU Minidome in Pocatello.

As regular season champions, Idaho State hosted and won the second edition of the four-team conference tournament; the 32-team NCAA tournament started on their home floor with a victory over Long Beach State.  the Bengals drew national attention with their one-point upset of longtime power UCLA in the  After UCLA scored to draw within one, freshman reserve guard Ernie Wheeler was quickly fouled in the backcourt with eight seconds remaining; he made both to go up by three.  UCLA scored again with a second left, but time ran out after ISU successfully got the ball inbounds. Wheeler had earlier hit both free throws with 37 seconds remaining; the Bengals made nine of ten free throws in the final two  This was the first time since 1963 that UCLA made the tournament but failed to get to the Final Four, which included the previous ten.

In the Elite Eight game (regional final) against UNLV, ISU led by a point at halftime, but lost by seventeen and ended the season 

For the third consecutive year, Hayes was named to the all-conference team, joined by senior guard Ed Thompson; junior forward Jeff Cook and senior forward Greg Griffin were on the second team.

The Bengals were the fourth (of five) Big Sky teams to advance to the Sweet Sixteen; they remain the only Elite Eight team in conference history, and the only one to post consecutive wins in a given NCAA tournament.

After the season in late March, Killingsworth departed for Oklahoma State University of the Big Eight Conference.

Roster

Postseason results

|-
!colspan=9 style=| Big Sky tournament

|-
!colspan=9 style=| NCAA tournament

References

External links
Sports Reference – Idaho State Bengals – 1976–77 basketball season
Idaho State University Athletics – 40th anniversary of 1977 Elite Eight team
Idaho State Journal – Yesteryear – Cinderella story: When ISU basketball beat UCLA
YouTube – Idaho State upsets UCLA, from Big Sky 50 Greatest Moments

Idaho State Bengals men's basketball seasons
Idaho State
Idaho State
Idaho State